Drew Moor (born January 15, 1984) is an American former professional soccer player who played as a center-back in Major League Soccer.

Born in Dallas, Moor began playing college soccer for the Furman Paladins before transferring to the Indiana Hoosiers. After three seasons with the Hoosiers, and helping the side with the 2004 College Cup, Moor was drafted in the first round of the 2005 MLS SuperDraft by FC Dallas with the 6th overall pick. He spent five seasons with FC Dallas, winning U.S. Open Cup titles, before being traded to the Colorado Rapids. In his full-debut season, Moor helped the Rapids win MLS Cup 2010, the club's first league championship title. In 2016, signed with Toronto FC and spent four seasons with the club before returning to the Rapids in 2020. During his time at Toronto FC, Moor was part of the side which won MLS Cup 2017, the Supporters' Shield, and three Canadian Championship titles.

Moor has been capped five times by the United States national team between 2007 and 2008.

College career 
Moor attended the Episcopal School of Dallas, and played college soccer for Furman University in 2002.

In 2003 Moor transferred to Indiana University, where he played for two seasons. He started every game during his college career and helped the Hoosiers to back-to-back National Championships. His last collegiate game was in the penalty kick thriller against UC Santa Barbara in the 2004 NCAA Finals in which Moor's Indiana was triumphant.

Moor was named All-Big Ten as a sophomore and a first-team All-American as a junior before forgoing his final year of eligibility to declare himself eligible for the MLS Superdraft.

Club career

Chicago Fire Premier 
Moor spent the summer of 2004 playing for Chicago Fire Premier in the Premier Development League.

FC Dallas 
Moor was drafted by FC Dallas with the sixth overall pick of the 2005 MLS SuperDraft. Moor made 20 appearances, including 9 starts, in his rookie season.

2006 was a breakout year for the second-year defender. He started in 21 consecutive games and set career highs in every statistical category. Moor scored his first career MLS goal on May 6, 2006, against the Houston Dynamo in a 4–3 loss.

In 2007, Moor led the team with 28 starts and scored two goals including a game-winning header against the Colorado Rapids on August 4, 2007, in a 1–0 victory. Moor made 27 appearances during the 2008 season, seven of them as the team captain. He led all FC Dallas defenders with two goals and was second in minutes played with 2,430 behind Kenny Cooper (2,622).

Colorado Rapids 

On August 31, 2009, Moor was traded to the Colorado Rapids along with a FC Dallas's second-round 2010 MLS SuperDraft pick and allocation money in exhangce for Ugo Ihemelu.

On June 5, 2010, Moor scored his first goal in a Rapids jersey, which won the game in the 85th minute against the Columbus Crew.

On August 31, 2011, Moor finished his 68th consecutive complete MLS game, breaking the MLS record for field players held by Peter Vermes.

Moor was named an MLS All-Star in 2015.

Toronto FC 
Following the 2015 season, Moor signed with Toronto FC as a free agent.  He became a key contributor to Toronto's success in the 2016 and 2017 seasons, where they reached the MLS Cup Finals both years, winning the title in 2017.  However, injuries became a factor for him in his third and fourth seasons with the club, reducing his playing time.

Return to Colorado 
Following the 2019 season, Moor rejoined Colorado, signing as a free agent. During the 2020 season, the Rapids experienced a COVID-19 outbreak in the team with many players and coaches becoming infected. Due to the entire coaching staff being unavailable, Moor was cast in the role of player-coach, running training sessions, although he never served in a role during a match, as all team matches were instead postponed. On September 30, 2022, Moor announced on his official Instagram account that he will retire once the 2022 season concludes.

Coaching 
Moor has publicly stated that he would consider a career in coaching soccer following his professional playing days on many occasions. On October 23, 2020, an article from The Denver Post revealed that in late September 2020, Moor had taken up a temporary role as a player-coach with Colorado amid a COVID-19 outbreak that left the entire coaching staff unavailable. Moor ran training sessions during his time in charge but did not serve in the role of a coach during a competitive match as all matches were postponed and Colorado head coach Robin Fraser returned to the field ahead of a match versus Sporting Kansas City on October 24, 2020.

International career 
Moor played for various youth United States national teams, and was part of the U-20 squad for the 2003 World Youth Championship in the United Arab Emirates.

In 2007, Moor received his first call up to the United States men's national soccer team, joining the team on June 24, 2007. On July 2, 2007, Moor made his international debut against Paraguay in a 3–1 loss.
He played for the United States in 2007 Copa América and started for the men's national team in a friendly versus Mexico on February 6, 2008, where he assisted Jozy Altidore for his first international goal.

Career statistics

Club

International

Honors
Indiana University
 College Cup: 2004

FC Dallas
 U.S. Open Cup runner-up (2): 2005, 2007

Colorado Rapids
 Eastern Conference Championship: 2010
 MLS Cup: 2010

Toronto FC
 MLS Cup: 2017; 
Runner-up 2016, 2019
 Canadian Championship (3): 2016, 2017, 2018
Runner-up 2019
 Supporters' Shield: 2017
 CONCACAF Champions League runner-up: 2018
 Trillium Cup (3): 2016, 2017, 2019
 Eastern Conference (Playoffs) (3): 2016, 2017, 2019

Individual
 MLS record for most consecutive games played by a field player (68)
 MLS All-Star: 2015

References

External links
 
 

1984 births
Living people
2007 Copa América players
American soccer players
Chicago Fire U-23 players
FC Dallas players
Colorado Rapids players
Toronto FC players
Colorado Rapids 2 players
Furman Paladins men's soccer players
Furman University alumni
Indiana Hoosiers men's soccer players
Major League Soccer players
United States men's international soccer players
USL League Two players
United States men's under-20 international soccer players
FC Dallas draft picks
Major League Soccer All-Stars
Soccer players from Texas
Association football defenders
All-American men's college soccer players
MLS Next Pro players